Camden was a merchant ship built upon the River Thames in 1799 as a West Indiaman. Between 1832 and 1833 she made two voyages transporting convicts from England to Australia. She was wrecked in 1836.

Career
Camden began her career as a West Indiaman. She entered Lloyd's Register (LR) in 1799.

On her first convict voyage, under the command of William Fulcher and surgeon David Boyter, she departed London on 28 March 1831 and arrived in Sydney, New South Wales, on 25 July. She embarked 198 male convicts and had no convict deaths en route.

On her second convict voyage, under the command of George Clayton and surgeon Joseph Steret, she departed Sheerness on 22 September 1832 and arrived in Sydney on 18 February 1833. She embarked 200 male convicts, two of whom died en route.

Lloyd's Register  for 1836 showed Camdens master as Ryan, and her trade as London—Sydney. Captain Valentine Ryan sailed from the Downs on 22 February 1836 and arrived at Sydney on 2 June. Camden was carrying passengers.

Fate
Camden was wrecked in the Strait of Madura, Dutch East Indies. She was on a voyage from Sydney to Soarabaga when she wrecked on 10 August 1836. Her crew were rescued.

Citations and references
Citations

References

1799 ships
Ships built on the River Thames
Convict ships to New South Wales
Age of Sail merchant ships
Maritime incidents in August 1836